Agonum octopunctatum is a species of ground beetle in the subfamily Harpalinae. It is found in North America.

References

Further reading

External links

 

octopunctatum
Articles created by Qbugbot
Beetles described in 1798
Taxa named by Johan Christian Fabricius